Łukasz Krzycki (born January 10, 1984 in Tychy) is a Polish footballer who plays for Piast Gliwice.

Career

Club
He will still play for Piast Gliwice in season 2011/2012.

References

External links
 

Polish footballers
Ekstraklasa players
Piast Gliwice players
1984 births
Living people
People from Tychy
Sportspeople from Silesian Voivodeship
Association football defenders